Bedias is a city in Grimes County, Texas, United States at the intersection of State Highway 90 and Farm Roads 1696 and 2620,  northeast of Navasota in northeastern Grimes County. It was incorporated as a city in 2003 and had a population of 361 at the 2020 census.

Demographics

As of the 2020 United States census, there were 361 people, 167 households, and 89 families residing in the city.

Education
Bedias and the surrounding area are served by the Madisonville Consolidated Independent School District.

Climate
The climate in this area is characterized by hot, humid summers and generally mild to cool winters.  According to the Köppen Climate Classification system, Bedias has a humid subtropical climate, abbreviated "Cfa" on climate maps.

References

External links
 
 City of Bedias official website

Cities in Grimes County, Texas
Cities in Texas
Populated places established in 2003